Sinop, historically known as Sinope, is a city on the isthmus of İnce Burun (İnceburun, Cape Ince), near Cape Sinope (Sinop Burnu, Boztepe Cape, Boztepe Burnu) which is situated on the northernmost edge of the Turkish side of the Black Sea coast, in the ancient region of Paphlagonia, in modern-day northern Turkey.  The city serves as the capital of Sinop Province.

History

Over a period of approximately 2,500 years, Sinope has at various times been settled by Colchians, Greeks (in the late 7th, late 5th, and 4th–3rd centuries BC), by Romans in the mid-1st century BC, and by Turkic people beginning in the 12th century. In the 19th and 20th centuries it was also settled by the muhacir who immigrated from the Balkans and Caucasus.

Evidence for Hittite Kingdom settlement along the Black Sea's southern shore remains murky. Researchers in the 1940s and 50s debated whether the "Great Sea", mentioned on the Boghazkoy tablets describing war between the Kizzuwatna tribe and the Hittites, could mean the Black Sea. Albrecht Goetze argued that the Hittites had never reached the northern Black Sea shore, instead drawing the northernmost boundary of the Hittite Kingdom to the south of the North Anatolia mountain range. D.S. Hogarth similarly concluded that the northern boundary of the Hittites never reached the shore. Hogarth's boundary was based on the distribution of Hittite monuments. Some objects found at Sinope are believed to be of Hittite origin.

The Greek colony of Sinope was founded by Ionians from the city of Miletus. Sinope issued its own coinage, founded colonies, and gave its name to a red earth pigment called sinopia, which was mined in Cappadocia for use throughout the ancient world. Some scholars have dated the earliest Greek colonization of Sinope to the 7th c. BC, while others have proposed an earlier date in the 8th c. While literary evidence exists supporting earlier settlement, archaeological evidence has been found of Greek settlement around the Black Sea region beginning in the late 7th century.

Sinope was strategically located among the trade routes that were developing on the southern Coast of the Black Sea, but remained relatively isolated from other inland communities until the 4th century BC. There is literary evidence of early links between Colchis and Sinope in mythological tradition. Strabos writings link the legendary founder of Sinope, Autolycus, with Jason and the Argonauts. Polybius described Sinope as being "on the way to Phasis". The Persian Achaemenid Empires northward expansion in the 4th century disrupted Sinope's control over its eastern colonies, including Trapezus (present day Trabzon). The satrap Datames briefly occupied the city around 375 BC. There is archaeological evidence of increased economic activity between the port city of Sinope and the surrounding inland areas during between 4th and 1st c. BC. Sinope appears to have maintained its independence from the dominion of Alexander the Great, and with the help of Rhodes turned back an assault led by Mithridates II of Pontus in 220 BC. Sinope eventually fell to Pharnaces I in 183 BC, after which it became the capital of the Pontic Kingdom.

The Roman general Lucullus conquered Sinope in 70 BC, and Julius Caesar established a Roman colony there, Colonia Julia Felix, in 47 BC. Mithradates Eupator was born and buried at Sinope, and it was the birthplace of Diogenes, of Diphilus, poet and actor of the New Attic comedy, of the historian Baton, and of the Christian heretic of the 2nd century AD, Marcion.

After the division of the Roman Empire in 395, Sinope remained with the Eastern Roman Empire. Its history in the early Byzantine period is obscure, except for isolated events: it was used by Justinian II as a base from which to reconnoitre Cherson, participated in the rebellion of the Armeniac Theme in 793, was the site of Theophobos' proclamation as emperor by his Khurramite troops in 838, and suffered its only attack by the Arabs in 858.

In 1081, the city was captured by the Seljuk Turks, who found there a sizeable treasury, but Sinope was soon recovered by Alexios I Komnenos, ushering a period of prosperity under the Komnenian dynasty. After the sacking of Constantinople by the Fourth Crusade in 1204, it was captured for the Empire of Trebizond by David Komnenos, until the Seljuk Turks of Rûm successfully captured the city in 1214. The city returned briefly to Trapezuntine rule in 1254, but returned to Turkish control in 1265, where it has remained since.

After 1265, Sinop became home to two successive independent emirates following the fall of the Seljuks: the Pervâne and the Jandarids. The Ottoman Sultan Mehmet II overawed Ismail, the emir of Sinope on his march on Trebizond, and forced him to surrender the city to the Sultan late June 1461 without a fight. The emir was exiled to Philippopolis (modern Plovdiv) in northern Thrace.

Ibn Battuta visited the city and stayed for about forty days.  He noted it was "a superb city which combines fortification with beautification."

In 1614, Sinop was targeted by Cossack raiders and extensively looted and burned in an event which shocked Ottoman contemporaries.

In November 1853, at the start of the Crimean War, in the Battle of Sinop, the Russians, under the command of Admiral Nakhimov, destroyed an Ottoman frigate squadron in Sinop, leading Britain and France to declare war on Russia.

In the late 19th and early 20th century, Sinop was part of the Kastamonu Vilayet of the Ottoman Empire.

As of 1920, Sinop was described as populated mainly by Greeks with an approximate population of 8,000. It was also considered the "safest" port "between Bosphorus and Batum", at the time. During this period, the port was exporting wheat, tobacco, seeds, timber and hides. They imported produce, coal and hardware.

Sinop hosted a US military base and radar that was important for intelligence during the Cold War era. The US base was closed in 1992.

Explorer Robert Ballard discovered an ancient ship wreck north west of Sinop in the Black Sea and was shown on National Geographic.

Numismatics

Greek coins featuring an eagle holding a dolphin or marine animal in its talons have been found in Sinope, Istria and Olbia. Located in present-day Turkey, Romania and Ukraine respective, all three were colonies of Miletus. The coins circulated between c. 450 and 325 BC. Coins of the "Sinope type" continued to be issued by Persians under Achaemenid rule in the 4th century BC. At least two Persian issuers of such coins have been studied in some detail: the satrap Datames in Cappadocia and Ariarathes.

Geography 
Sinop is located on a promontory at the narrowest point of the Black Sea. It has two harbors and is located along the southern shore of the Black Sea, near the shortest crossing to the Crimea. The nearby mountainous terrain is green and noted for its timber.

Climate 
Sinop has a humid subtropical climate (Köppen: Cfa, Trewartha: Cf).

Sinop has warm summers with an average daytime high of 26 °C (79 °F), and temperatures rarely exceed 30 °C (86 °F). The winters are cool and wet, the average for February is just below .  Snowfall is occasional December to March, sometimes lasting a week or two.

Economy
As of 1920, Sinop was producing embroidered cotton cloth. They also were known for boatbuilding. The boats produced in Sinop were described by a British observer as being of "primitive design but sound workmanship."

Sinop was slated to be the site of the Sinop Nuclear Power Plant, a $15.8 billion nuclear power plant to be developed by Elektrik Üretim, Engie, Mitsubishi Heavy Industries and Itochu. The plant would consist of four reactors, with construction to begin in 2017 and completion by 2028. The project was cancelled in 2018.

Cultural and other attractions

Visitor attraction places in Sinop are:

Pasha Bastion is a half-moon coastal bastion, a semi-circular fortification, situated southeast of Sinop Peninsula. It was constructed to protect the city against attacks coming from the Black Sea during the Russo-Turkish War, Crimean War (1853–1856). It features an artillery battery of eleven cannons, an arsenal and basement. Today, it is used as a place for refreshments premise.

Historic Water Tunnel is an ancient underground water supply channel situated at Sülüklü Göl (literally: Lake of Leeches.
 
Balatlar Church is a ruined church from the Byzantine Empire period. It is partly preserved as only the chapel vault is in undamaged condition while other parts of the church have no roof any more. Fresco paintings on the chapel's ceiling and on the nave walls are still intact.
 
Serapeum is a ruined temple dedicated to the combined  Hellenistic-Ancient Egyptian deity Serapis, situated in the southwestern corner in the yard of Sinop Archaeological Museum.

Alaaddin Mosque is a 13th-century mosque of Seljuk architecture named after its endower Sultan Alaaddin Kayqubad I (1188–1237).

Pervane Medrese is a former Islamic religious school, which was closed down after the proclamation of the Republic. The 13th-century building was used as a depot for archaeological artifacts and ethnographic items from 1932 on, and served as a museum between 1941 and 1970. It hosts souvenir shops today.

Sinop Fortress is a fortification surrounding the peninsula and the isthmus of Sinop. It was built initially by migrants from Miletus in the 8th century BC. The fortress underwent reparation and expansion to its current extent during the reign of King Mithridates IV of Pontus in the 2nd century BC after its  destruction by the Cimmerians in the 7th century BC. Some parts of the fortress, especially the north walls, are ruined.

Sinop Fortress Prison is a defunct state prison situated inside the Sinop Fortress. Served between 1887 and 1997, the prison rose to fame when it featured in many literature works of notable authors, who were inmates of the prison for political reasons. It became also a shooting set for many movies and television series. It is a prison museum today.

Sinop Archaeological Museum is a 1941-established archaeological museum exhibiting artifacts dating back to Early Bronze Age and from the Hellenistic, Roman, Byzantine, Seljuk and Ottoman periods as well.

Sinop Ethnographic Museum is a museum of ethnographic exhibits belonging to the cultural history of the region. It is situated in a large 18th-century mansion.

Statue of Diogenes is a monument to the Ancient Greek philosopher Diogenes of Sinope born in Sinop in about 412 BC.

Notable people

 Historical
 Aquila of Sinope (2nd century), Bible translator
 Diogenes of Sinope (412 or 404 BC–323 BC), philosopher
 Diphilus (4th century BC), Middle Comedy playwright
 Gazi Chelebi (14th century), naval commander
 İsfendiyar Bey of the Candar beylik
 Marcion of Sinope (c. 85–160), founder of Marcionism
 Mithridates VI of Pontus (134–63 BC), king of Pontus
 Phocas, Bishop of Sinope (died 117)
 Saint Phocas (c. 300)
 Saint Helen of Sinope (18th century)
 Seydi Ali Reis, Ottoman admiral, writer and scientist, was born into a family who was originally from Sinop.

 Contemporary
 Rıza Nur (1879–1942), politician
 Ahmet Muhip Dıranas (1909–1980), poet
 Necmettin Erbakan (1926–2011), former prime minister
 Patriarch Maximus V of Constantinople (1897–1972), Ecumenical Patriarch of Constantinople 
 Osman Pamukoğlu (1947–), politician
 Metin Tuğlu (1984–), footballer
 Hakan Ünsal (1973–), footballer
 Sinan Uzun (1990–), footballer
 Gökçe Akyıldız (1992-), actress
Ayça Ayşin Turan (1992-) actress

Legacy
Sinope has given its name to the outermost satellite of Jupiter. A crater on Mars is named after Sinop too.

Sister cities

Sinop has ten sister cities:

Gallery

See also
 Pervâneoğlu dynasty
 Isfendiyarids
 Gazi Çelebi
 Aquila of Sinope 
 Sinope Gospels

References

External links

 John Garstang, The Hittite Empire, Being a Survey of the History, Geography and Monuments of Hittite Asia Minor and Syria (London: Constable and Company Ltd, 1929).
 Pictures of Sinop

 
Ancient Greek archaeological sites in Turkey
Greek colonies in Anatolia
Greek colonies on the Black Sea coast
Milesian colonies
Black Sea port cities and towns in Turkey
Cities in Turkey
Districts of Sinop Province
Fishing communities in Turkey
Paphlagonia
Populated coastal places in Turkey
Populated places in Sinop Province
Roman towns and cities in Turkey
Populated places established in the 7th century BC

vi:Sinop